Habenaria propinquior, commonly known as the common rein orchid, is a species of orchid that is endemic to north  Queensland. It has two to four leaves at its base and up to thirty white flowers with thread-like lobes on the labellum.

Description 
The dorsal sepal and petals overlap at their bases and form a hood over the column. The petals are a similar length to the sepals but narrower. Flowering occurs between January and April.

Taxonomy and naming
Habenaria propinquior was first formally described in 1871 by Heinrich Gustav Reichenbach from a specimen collected at Rockingham Bay and the description was published in his book Beitrage zur Systematischen Pflanzenkunde. The specific epithet (propinquior) is derived from the Latin word propinquus meaning "near" or "neighbouring".

Distribution and habitat
The common rein orchid grows in sandy heath which is covered by water in the wet season. It is found on the Cape York Peninsula and as far south as Rockhampton, also occurring on some islands in the Torres Strait.

References

Orchids of Queensland
Endemic orchids of Australia
Plants described in 1871
propinquior